Davor Škrlec (born 1 January 1963) is a Croatian electrical engineer and liberal politician. He has been a Member of the European Parliament (MEP) for Croatia since the 2014 European Parliament election. He was a member of the Sustainable Development of Croatia party He is one of the first two green politicians elected to the European Parliament from the newer European Union members, along with Tamás Meszerics (Politics Can Be Different) elected in the 2014 election in Hungary.

In April 2016, Škrlec left ORaH because of "dissatisfaction over how the party is run, and the party's passivity towards the problems of the Croatian society".

Before becoming MEP, he was employed at the Faculty of Electrical Engineering and Computing, University of Zagreb as a full-time professor.

References

1963 births
Living people
People from Vinkovci
MEPs for Croatia 2014–2019
Academic staff of the University of Zagreb